Melville Arthur Syme  is a community leader from Kaikōura, New Zealand, who has been involved in a wide range of community groups and activities in the town.

Kaikōura Lions Club 
Syme has been a member of the Kaikōura Lions Club since 1968 and became president after just six years.  He was District Governor from 2001 to 2002.

One of the significant projects led by Syme was the construction of a new footbridge over Lyell Creek, after a severe storm, ex- tropical Cyclone Alison, caused extensive damage in Kaikōura in March 1975, and damaged the existing bridge.  The construction of the new footbridge required 26 working bees over a period of six months.  In another community project, Syme designed and constructed a bridge on a walkway linking the seal colony with Jimmy Armers beach  in 2010, as part of a Lions Club initiative.

Mayfair Theatre 

Syme has had a long association with the Mayfair Theatre in Kaikōura, an art deco building on the Esplanade.  Along with his wife Julie, he is a former owner of the theatre.  The Mayfair Theatre was first opened in 1935 as a venue for cinema and concerts. In 1985, the building was put up for sale and by 1986, it had been purchased for the town as a result of a community fundraising initiative.  Syme and his wife were both members of the Theatre Committee who managed the venue from that point.

Symes and his wife led a further fundraising campaign in 2013 to convert the cinema to digital technology, and this work was completed in November 2013.

The 2016 Kaikōura earthquake caused damage to the theatre building that was beyond repair.  However, the 1934 art deco façade suffered only relatively minor damage, and the digital projection equipment was undamaged and was salvaged for later re-use. Syme was involved in the major fundraising efforts to build a new cinema and performance venue on the site, retaining the façade.  After a $3.6 million restoration project, the building was re-opened in November 2020 as the Mayfair Arts and Culture Centre Te Whare Toi ō Kaikōura.  As at 2022, Syme and his wife are members of the Mayfair Board of Directors.

Native forest restoration 
This project was initiated by St Paul's Presbyterian Church, and was called He Timatanga Hou /New Beginnings. The project received funding support from the Community Environment Fund, the Kaikōura District Council, the Kaikōura Lions Club, Waipapa Lime Works, Kaikōura New World and Environment Canterbury. The project was also supported by Te Runanga ō Kaikōura, the Historic Places Trust and Te Runanga ō Ngāi Tahu. Syme was the representative of St Paul's Presbyterian Church on the project team. The project includes a walkway, and took five years to complete. Syme had the role of foreman for much of that time.

Other community roles 

Syme has been involved in many other community organisations in Kaikōura, including the Presbyterian Church, Federated Farmers, and the Kaikōura A&P Association.

Honours and awards 
In the 2016 Queen's Birthday Honours, Syme was awarded the Queen's Service Medal, for services to the community.

Personal life 
Syme and his wife Julie have been farmers.

References

External links
 Mayfair Theatre official website

Recipients of the Queen's Service Medal
People from Kaikōura
Living people
New Zealand farmers
Year of birth missing (living people)